Adelina is a genus of darkling beetles in the family Tenebrionidae. There are about seven described species in Adelina.

Species
These seven species belong to the genus Adelina:
 Adelina bacardi g
 Adelina bidens b
 Adelina frontalis (Champion, 1886) g
 Adelina pallida (Say) b
 Adelina pici (Ardoin, 1977) g
 Adelina plana (Fabricius, 1801) i c g b
 Adelina subcornuta (Ardoin, 1977) g
Data sources: i = ITIS, c = Catalogue of Life, g = GBIF, b = Bugguide.net

References

Further reading

External links

 

Tenebrionidae
Articles created by Qbugbot